Yamiutsu shinzo may refer to:
 Yamiutsu shinzo (1982 film), a Japanese film directed by Shunichi Nagasaki
 Yamiutsu shinzo (2005 film), a part-remake, part-sequel to the 1982 film, also directed by Shunichi Nagasaki